Hodapp is a surname. Notable people with the surname include:

Christopher L. Hodapp (born 1958), American author and filmmaker
Frieda Hodapp (1880–1949), a German pianist
Johnny Hodapp (1905–1980), American professional baseball player
Leroy Charles Hodapp (1923–2006), Bishop of the United Methodist Church in the United States
Robert Louis Hodapp (1910–1989), American-born Catholic bishop in Belize